Binbir Gece is a Turkish soap opera revolving around four main characters: Sehrazat, Onur, Kerem and Bennu. The story is loosely based on the story of One Thousand and One Nights, better known as Arabian Nights. It stars Halit Ergenç as Onur, Bergüzar Korel as Şehrazat, Tardu Flordun as Kerem and Ceyda Düvenci as Bennu.

Title 
The title is the name of the story better known to the English-speaking world as Arabian Nights. The film's storyline is loosely based on the story, containing references thereto.

Synopsis
Şehrazat is an aspiring architect who is in desperate need for money to pay for the treatment of her son, Kaan, who is suffering from leukemia. After pleading to borrow money from several sources, she is stuck with her boss, Onur, who agrees to give her the money she needs for Kaan's treatment on the condition that she spends a night with him.

Episodes

Cast

 Halit Ergenç as Onur Aksal 
 Bergüzar Korel as Sehrazat Evliyaoglu Aksal
 Ceyda Düvenci as Bennu Ataman Inceoglu
 Tardu Flordun as Kerem Inceoglu
 Mehmet Polat as Erdal Karayolcu (Villain)
Canan Ergüder as Eda Akinay (Main villain, commits suicide)
Efe Çinar as Kaan Evliyaoglu
 Meral Çetinkaya as Peride Aksal
Aytaç Öztuna as Seval Inceoglu
 Mert Firat as Burak Inceoglu
Yeliz Akkaya as Melek Ataman 
Sebnem Köstem as Handan Tascioglu
Nihat Ileri as Semih Özsener
Duygu Çetinkaya as Sezen Özsener Inceoglu (Later divorced) 
Metin Çekmez as Burhan Evliyaoglu
 Tomris İncer as Nadide Evliyaoglu
 Ergün Demir as Ali Kemal Evliyaoglu
Yonca Cevher Yenel as Füsun Ozcelik Evliyaoglu
Füsun Kostak as Cansel Kilic (Dies)
Bartu Küçükçaglayan as Gani Ozcelik
Feyzan Çapa / Gizem Günes as Buket Evliyaoglu
Hazal Gürel as Burcu Evliyaoglu
Nehir Nil Karakaya as Burcin Evliyaoglu
Metin Belgin as Zafer Gündüzalp (Dies in a plane crash)
Merih Ermakastar as Mert
 Ayla Algan as Betül
Melahat Abbasova as Mihriban Vahapzade
Suphi Tekniker as Yalcin
Zeynep Konan as Zeynep
Nihan Durukan as Aysen
Ayce Abana as Beyza Kayaoglu
Nuray Uslu as Sevgi
Feridun Düzagaç as Özcan Turkmen (Killed by Eda)
Volga Sorgu Tekinoğlu as Mahmut Demir (Killed by Eda)
Ismail Düvenci as Ismail
Teoman Kumbaracibasi as Yaman Cindar
Sennur Kaya as Firdevs
Ebru Aykaç as Yasemin Karakus
Erdal Bilingen as Hakan
Karina Gükrer as Nimet
Nazli Ceren Argon as Ayse
Hazel Çamlidere as Ahu Işler (Villain)
Ayben Erman as Neriman Işler (Villain)
Alptekin Serdengeçti as Haldun Kara
Dilara Kavadar as Nilüfer Aksal
Nilüfer Silsupur / Ahu Sungur as Jale Eryildiz (Villain, later good, killed by Erdal)
Ege Aydan as Engin Kayaoglu
 Ezgi Asaroglu as Duru Kayaoglu

Reception
Binbir Gece was a hit in Chile, where its success resulted in many Chileans naming their babies Onur (boys) & Sheherazade (girls). It played in the United States, Colombia, Argentina and Brazil. It was a hit in Russia in the Turkish Drama Category. The show was picked up by Netflix in the United States, but curiously only the first 49 episodes as of August 2017. This has infuriated a number of Netflix viewers that watched the series not knowing it would end abruptly at episode 49, leaving many matters unanswered. A writing campaign is underway.

The series became a primetime hit in Croatia, Bosnia and Herzegovina, Montenegro, Serbia and Macedonia as well as in Romania, Albania, Bulgaria and Greece. It increased the popularity of Istanbul as a tourist destination among Serbs and led to a greater interest in learning Turkish.

Broadcast
The series originally aired from November 7, 2006 to May 12, 2009 on Kanal D. It aired in more than 56 countries. The series aired in Chile on Mega from March 3, 2014 until January 4, 2015, in Indonesia on antv as "Shehrazat : Seribu Satu Malam" from August 3, 2015, and in Brazil on Band from March 9, 2015 until September 15, 2015. On March 1, 2021, the series premiered on Nagorik in Bangladesh as Sahasra Ek Rajani. On the same day, it was also made available for streaming on Bongo BD.

Remake

It was announced that it would be remade in Hindi and on 14 October 2022, the first promo of the show starring Aditi Sharma and Adnan Khan titled Katha Ankahee released and premiered on SET India on 5 December 2022.

Awards
The major TV awards ceremony in Turkey (often dubbed as the Turkish Oscars), the Altın Kelebek, (Golden Butterfly Awards) resulted in three wins for the series.

Notes

References

External links
 
 

Turkish drama television series
2006 Turkish television series debuts
2009 Turkish television series endings
2000s Turkish television series
Kanal D original programming
Works based on One Thousand and One Nights
Television shows based on fairy tales
Turkish television series endings
Television shows set in Istanbul
Television series produced in Istanbul